Arpagadik or Arpagetik is a village in the Khojavend District of Azerbaijan, in the disputed region of Nagorno-Karabakh. The village had an ethnic Armenian-majority population prior to the 2020 Nagorno-Karabakh war.

Toponymy 
The village was historically also known as Karing.

History 
During the Soviet period, the village was part of the Hadrut District of the Nagorno-Karabakh Autonomous Oblast. After the First Nagorno-Karabakh War, the village was administrated as part of the Hadrut Province of the Republic of Artsakh. The village was captured by Azerbaijan during the 2020 Nagorno-Karabakh war.

Demographics 
The village had 24 inhabitants in 2015.

References

External links 
 

Populated places in Khojavend District
Nagorno-Karabakh
Former Armenian inhabited settlements